Henry Leke (by 1526 – 1558 or later), believed to be of London, was an English politician.

He was a Member (MP) of the Parliament of England for Lyme Regis in 1547 and for Devizes in April 1554.

References

Year of death missing
People from Devizes
English MPs 1547–1552
English MPs 1554
Year of birth uncertain